The 2009 Meteor Music Awards ceremony took place on 17 March 2009 in the RDS, Dublin. It was the ninth edition of Ireland's national music awards. The event was recorded and it aired on RTÉ Two on 18 March 2009. The awards show was hosted by television presenter Amanda Byram.

The general public were eligible to vote in eight categories - Best Irish Band, Best Irish Male, Best Irish Female, Best Irish Pop Act, Best Irish Album, Best Irish Live Performance, Best National DJ and Best Regional DJ. AC/DC, Coldplay, Elbow, The Killers and Kings of Leon were nominated for Best International Band, whilst Boyzone, The Blizzards, The Coronas, The Script and Westlife were the nominees for Best Irish Pop Act. Mick Flannery, Damien Dempsey, Duke Special, David Holmes and Richard Egan of Jape were nominated in the Best Irish Male category, whilst Enya, Lisa Hannigan, Gemma Hayes, Imelda May, Tara Blaise and Camille O'Sullivan were nominated in the Best Irish Female category. The Hope for 2009 nominees were announced on 18 February, with public voting commencing on 23 February. Hot Press editor Niall Stokes received an industry award, whilst Father Shay Cullen's PREDA Foundation received €100,000. The Lifetime Achievement Award was given to traditional folk musician Sharon Shannon.

Performances 
Boyzone, The Blizzards, Sharon Shannon, Stereophonics and Imelda May performed on the night.

Nominations 
The nominees were officially announced on 28 January 2009, having initially been published on the official site the night before only to be quickly removed. And the winners are...

Public Voting Categories

Best National DJ 
Alison Curtis – Today FM
Dave Fanning – RTÉ 2fm
Tony Fenton – Today FM
Ray Foley – Today FM
Dan Hegarty – RTÉ 2fm
Rick O'Shea – RTÉ 2fm
Presented by Lorraine Keane

Best Regional DJ 
Keith Cunningham (KC) - RedFM
Dermot, Dave & Siobhan – Dublin's 98
Leigh Doyle – Beat 102-103
Mark Noble – FM 104
Jon Richards – Galway Bay FM
The Zoo Crew – Spin South West
Presented by Lucy Kennedy and Nancy Cartwright

Best Irish Band 
The Blizzards
Fight Like Apes
Republic of Loose
The Script
Snow Patrol
Presented by Sonya Lennon and Brendan Courtney

Best Irish Male 
Damien Dempsey
Duke Special
Mick Flannery
David Holmes
Jape

Best Irish Female 
Tara Blaise
Lisa Hannigan
Gemma Hayes
Imelda May
Camille O'Sullivan

Best Irish Pop Act 
Boyzone
The Blizzards
The Coronas
The Script
Westlife
Presented by Pádraig Harrington

Best Irish Album 
Fight Like Apes – Fight Like Apes and the Mystery of the Golden Medallion
Lisa Hannigan – Sea Sew
Messiah J & The Expert – From the Word Go
The Script – The Script
Snow Patrol – A Hundred Million Suns
Presented by Tony Lundon, Liam McCormack and Sinéad McKenna

Best Irish Live Performance 
The Blizzards - Oxegen 2008
The Coronas - The Button Factory
Fight Like Apes - Whelan's
Republic of Loose - The Academy
The Swell Season - Olympia Theatre
Presented by Craig Doyle and Devon Murray

Non-Public Voting Categories

Best Traditional/Folk 
Damien Dempsey
Martin Hayes & Dennis Cahill
Colm Mac Con Iomaire
Eleanor McEvoy
John Spillane
Presented by Bláthnaid Ní Chofaigh and Anna Nolan

Best International Live Performance 
The Script
Coldplay 
Kings of Leon
Bruce Springsteen
The Killers

Best International Band 
AC/DC
Coldplay
Elbow
The Killers
Kings of Leon
Presented by Caprice and Laura Whitmore
Elbow won the award in 2009.

Best International Female 
Beyoncé
Duffy
Lykke Li
Pink
Rihanna

Best International Male 
Chris Brown
Nick Cave
Bon Iver
James Morrison
Kanye West
Presented by Louis Walsh

Best International Album 
Day & Age - The Killers
Fleet Foxes - Fleet Foxes
Only by the Night - Kings of Leon
The Circus - Take That
Viva la Vida or Death and All His Friends - Coldplay

Lifetime Achievement Award 
 Sharon Shannon
Presented by Gráinne and Síle Seoige

Humanitarian Award 
 Father Shay Cullen's PREDA Foundation
Presented by Pat Kenny and Conor Carmody from Meteor

Industry Award 
 Niall Stokes
Presented by Dave Fanning and Joe Elliott

Hope for 2009 
 Autumn Owls
 Fred
 House of Cosy Cushions
 James Vincent McMorrow
 Wallis Bird
Presented by Rick O'Shea

Most Downloaded Song 
"Galway Girl" – Mundy and Sharon Shannon

Multiple nominations 
Lisa Hannigan was the only solo artist to be nominated in more than one category. She was nominated in two categories, Best Irish Female and Best Irish Album. She won neither.
 3 - The Blizzards
 3 - Coldplay
 3 - Fight Like Apes
 3 - The Killers
 3 - Kings of Leon
 3 - The Script
 2 - The Coronas
 2 - Lisa Hannigan
 2 - Republic of Loose
 2 - Snow Patrol

References

External links
 Official site
 MCD Promotions
 List of winners through the years
 2009 photos at Hot Press

Meteor Music Awards
Meteor Awards